Vladislav Mikhailovich Tyufyakov (born 29 August 1996) is a Russian football player.

Club career
He made his debut for the main squad of FC Kuban Krasnodar on 23 September 2015 in a Russian Cup game against FC Shinnik Yaroslavl. He made his Russian Football National League debut for Kuban on 21 August 2016 in a game against FC Mordovia Saransk.

References

External links
 

1996 births
Sportspeople from Kirov, Kirov Oblast
Living people
Russian footballers
Association football defenders
Association football midfielders
FC Kuban Krasnodar players
FC KAMAZ Naberezhnye Chelny players
FC Inter Cherkessk players